Hanna Shostak (1883–1965) was a folk painter of Ukraine. She was a member of the USSR Union of Artists and Master of Folk Art of the UkSSR.

Life
She was born in 1883 in Skoptsi, Poltava Governorate and she had a rudimentary education. Her interest in skill in art was largely self-taught. She came under the influence of mentors that included Aleksandra Ekster. With their guidance her folk art designs were used for carpets. The carpets won awards.

In 1963–1964 her designs were featured on Ukrainian stamps. She became a member of the USSR Union of Artists and Master of Folk Art of the UkSSR.

References

External links 
 
 Sobachko-Shostak, Hanna at the International Encyclopedia of Ukraine

1883 births
1965 deaths
People from Kyiv Oblast
People from Poltava Governorate
20th-century Ukrainian women artists
Folk artists
Recipients of the Shevchenko National Prize
Soviet painters